This article is about the list of Futebol Clube Bravos do Maquis players. F.C. Bravos do Maquis is an Angolan football (soccer) club based in Luena, Moxico, Angola and plays at Estádio Jones Cufuna Mundunduleno.  The club was established in 1983.

FC Bravos do Maquis 2020–2021

2011–2020

2001–2010

FC Bravos do Maquis 2001–2010

External links
 Official site
 Squad at official website
 Squad at Girabola.com
 Schedule at Girabola.com
 Zerozero.pt profile
 Facebook profile
 Match schedule

References

F.C. Bravos do Maquis
F.C. Bravos do Maquis players
Association football player non-biographical articles